Siniša Školneković (born January 18, 1968 in Varaždin) is a former Croatian water polo player and coach. He represented Croatia at the 1996 Summer Olympics in Atlanta and the 2000 Summer Olympics in Sydney.

See also
 Croatia men's Olympic water polo team records and statistics
 List of Olympic medalists in water polo (men)
 List of men's Olympic water polo tournament goalkeepers

External links
 

1968 births
Living people
Croatian male water polo players
Water polo goalkeepers
Olympic silver medalists for Croatia in water polo
Water polo players at the 1996 Summer Olympics
Water polo players at the 2000 Summer Olympics
Medalists at the 1996 Summer Olympics
Croatian water polo coaches
Sportspeople from Varaždin
Croatian sportsperson-politicians
Croatian expatriate sportspeople in Italy
Expatriate water polo players